Graham Best Smedley (November 10, 1879 – June 16, 1954) was a justice of the Supreme Court of Texas from September 21, 1945 to June 16, 1954.

References

Justices of the Texas Supreme Court
1879 births
1954 deaths